Bogdănești is a commune in Briceni District, Moldova. It is composed of three villages: Bezeda, Bogdănești and Grimești.

References

Communes of Briceni District
Populated places on the Prut
Hotin County
Ținutul Suceava